Nadikudi is a part of dachepalli municipality in Palnadu district of the Indian state of Andhra Pradesh. It is located in Dachepalli Town of Gurazala revenue division.

Geography 
Nadikudi is situated to the west of the mandal headquarters, Dachepalle,

Governance 
DACHEPALLI is a nagar panchayat(municipality) from January 2020  formed municipality or nagar panchayat by Andhrapradesh government order.

Education 
As per the school information report for the academic year 2018–19, the village has a total of 13 schools. These schools include 7 MPP and 6 private schools.

References 

Villages in Palnadu district